Ritang, Bhutan is a town in Wangdue Phodrang District in central-northern Bhutan.

References

External links
Satellite map at Maplandia.com

Populated places in Bhutan